La Bamba is a 1987 American biographical drama film written and directed by Luis Valdez. The film follows the life and short-lived musical career of Mexican-American Chicano rock and roll star Ritchie Valens. The film stars Lou Diamond Phillips as Valens, Esai Morales, Rosanna DeSoto, Elizabeth Peña, Danielle von Zerneck and Joe Pantoliano. The film also covers the effect that Valens' career had on the lives of his half-brother Bob Morales, his girlfriend Donna Ludwig, and the rest of his family. The film is titled after a Mexican folk song of the same name, which Valens transformed into a rock and roll rendition in 1958. In 2017, La Bamba was included in the annual selection of 25 motion pictures added to the National Film Registry of the US Library of Congress being deemed "culturally, historically, or aesthetically significant" and recommended for preservation.

Plot
During the Summer of 1957 in Northern California, Richard "Richie" Steven Valenzuela is a 16-year old Mexican-American boy who lives with his mother, Concepcion “Connie” Valenzuela and his younger brothers and sisters. His family is poor, and he works as a farmhand after school. He loves music, especially rock and roll, and dreams of becoming a famous musician. Richie suffers from aviophobia due to recurring nightmares about the mid-air collision that occurred directly over his school, in which his best friend was crushed to death by the fallen aircraft, an event he did not witness due to attending his grandfather's funeral. One day, Richie's troubled older half-brother Bob Morales arrives after being released from jail, surprising him and his mother. They all decide to leave the farm and move to a house in Southern California, along with Bob's girlfriend, Rosie.

Three months later, Richie attends San Fernando High School where he falls in love with fellow student Donna Ludwig, and joins his friend Chino's band, The Silhouettes. Bob becomes an alcoholic and starts to abuse Rosie, shouting at her and raping her. When he learns that Rosie is pregnant, he refuses to take responsibility. Richie invites Donna to a garage party where he and the Silhouettes are performing. At the party, Richie performs on his guitar, but he doesn't get his turn to sing and Donna does not attend.

Richie decides to host another party and becomes The Silhouettes’ new leader after they vote out their original leader. However, a drunken Bob crashes the party and starts a brawl among the attendees. The next day, Bob Keane, the owner and president of Del-Fi Records in Hollywood, auditions Richie after seeing him perform at the party and signs him to his label; Keane becomes his record producer and manager. Richie and Donna become a couple, despite Donna's father disapproving of his daughter dating a Hispanic boy, and Richie starts recording songs like "We Belong Together" and "Come On, Let's Go" at Gold Star Studios. Keane gives Richie his professional name of "Ritchie Valens", which Richie dislikes at first, but eventually accepts it. Ritchie starts releasing his songs on the radio and becomes an overnight sensation.

Despite his increasing fame, Ritchie's relationship with Donna suffers with her father refusing to let Ritchie see her. He then gets the inspiration to write the song "Donna", as a tribute to her. One night, Bob meets up with Ritchie, and they go to Tijuana, Mexico. At a brothel, Ritchie sees a band performing the Mexican folk song "La Bamba". He awakens the next day in a small village and is given a talisman by an old man called El Curandero to protect him from his fear of flying. Ritchie and Bob return home to discover that Rosie gave birth to a girl in their absence. Ritchie soon decides to make a rock and roll rendition of "La Bamba" as a single to go along with "Donna" and convinces Keane to release it.

At first, Ritchie avoids flying to his concerts and appearances, but eventually conquers his fear when invited to perform his song "Donna" on American Bandstand in Philadelphia. Keane helps him by giving him a little vodka to calm his nerves during the flight. Bob soon becomes jealous of Ritchie's success and drinks excessively while screaming and shouting at his family, wanting to see his daughter. Ritchie buys his family a brand new house and goes to New York City to perform at Alan Freed's 1st Anniversary Rock 'n' Roll Show at the Brooklyn Paramount Theater, meeting Eddie Cochran and Jackie Wilson backstage. He then goes onstage to perform "La Bamba" to the crowd's adoration. Arriving home for Christmas, he is given a welcoming party by his family and friends, but Bob is resentful and later starts a fight with Ritchie, breaking his talisman in the process. Ritchie promises Donna that he will always love her and hopes that one day they will get married.

Ritchie later joins the Winter Dance Party tour with Buddy Holly (Marshall Crenshaw) and The Big Bopper after "La Bamba" and "Donna" reach the top of the Billboard charts. While performing in Clear Lake, Iowa, at the Surf Ballroom, the tour bus' heating system breaks down, so Holly charters an airplane to fly to their next stop in Moorhead, Minnesota. Valens, Holly, and the Big Bopper take off in the airplane during a snowstorm on February 2, 1959. Before the flight, Ritchie makes a call to his brother, wherein they resolve their differences. He invites Bob to fly out to Chicago to join the tour for family support, which Bob accepts.

The next day, as Bob is fixing his mother's car, he hears on the radio that his brother's airplane crashed, killing everyone on board. Bob darts out of his driveway in an attempt to get to his mother before she hears the news, but is too late. The news hits the Valenzuela family, Bob Keane, and Donna very hard. After Ritchie's funeral procession at the San Fernando Mission Cemetery, Bob walks across a bridge and screams out Ritchie's name, remembering all the good times they had together.

Cast
 Lou Diamond Phillips as Ritchie Valens
 Esai Morales as Roberto "Bob" Morales (Ritchie's half-brother)
 Rosanna DeSoto as Connie Valenzuela (Ritchie's mother)
 Elizabeth Peña as Rosie Morales
 Danielle von Zerneck as Donna Ludwig
 Joe Pantoliano as Bob Keane
 Rick Dees as Ted Quillin
 Stephen Lee as The Big Bopper
 Sam Anderson as Mr. Ludwig (Donna's father)

Also featured are several members of the Valenzuela family and director Luis Valdez's family, including:
 Concepcion Valenzuela (the real Connie Valenzuela, Ritchie's mother) as the older woman sitting next to Ritchie at a family party
 Daniel Valdez (Luis' younger brother) as Ritchie's Uncle Lelo

Brian Setzer has a cameo as Eddie Cochran performing "Summertime Blues" onstage, while Howard Huntsberry plays Jackie Wilson singing "Lonely Teardrops" onstage. Marshall Crenshaw plays Buddy Holly performing "Crying, Waiting, Hoping" at the final concert in Clear Lake, Iowa.

Background
All of Ritchie Valens' songs were performed by Los Lobos, whom the Valenzuela family personally requested be involved in the film. The band has a cameo in the film performing in the brothel ballroom in Tijuana.

Distribution
The film opened in wide release in the United States on July 24, 1987. In the Philippines, it premiered on September 10, 1987. In Australia it opened on September 17, 1987.

In its opening weekend, the film grossed a total of $5,698,884. La Bamba eventually grossed $52,678,820 in the United States in 12 weeks.

Critical response

Roger Ebert liked the film and the screenplay, writing, "This is a good small movie, sweet and sentimental, about a kid who never really got a chance to show his stuff. The best things in it are the most unexpected things: the portraits of everyday life, of a loving mother, of a brother who loves and resents him, of a kid growing up and tasting fame and leaving everyone standing around at his funeral shocked that his life ended just as it seemed to be beginning." Writing for The New York Times, Janet Maslin said she was impressed with Lou Diamond Phillips' performance, and wrote, "A film like this is quite naturally a showcase for its star, and as Valens, Lou Diamond Phillips has a sweetness and sincerity that in no way diminish the toughness of his onstage persona. The role is blandly written, but Mr. Phillips gives Valens backbone."

Accolades
Wins
 Broadcast Music Incorporated: BMI Film Music Award, Carlos Santana and Miles Goodman; 1988.
 Hispanic Academy of Media Arts and Sciences: Imagen Latino media-image award; 1988.

Nominations
 Golden Globe Award: Best Motion Picture, Drama; 1988.

Soundtrack

References

External links

 
 
 
 La Bamba official trailer on YouTube

1987 films
1987 drama films
1980s biographical films
1980s English-language films
Hispanic and Latino American drama films
American biographical drama films
American rock music films
Biographical films about musicians
Columbia Pictures films
Films directed by Luis Valdez
Films set in the 1950s
Films set in 1957
Films set in 1958
Films set in 1959
Films set in Mexico
Films set in the San Fernando Valley
Films shot in Los Angeles
Films about Mexican Americans
United States National Film Registry films
1980s American films